Echo Planet (also known as Adventure Planet) is a 2012 Thai 3D animation film produced and distributed by Kantana Group directed by Kompin Keamkumned. It is the story of the adventures of three young men from two of the world's metropolis, New State Trinity Capital and Karen village in Northern Thailand. To help save the world from disaster recovery due to global warming.

Plot
Sam is the spoiled and disgruntled son of the Capital City president. During a trip with the scouts, the child, who relies too much on technology, gets lost and ends up in the rural village of an exotic country where Nora and her brother Kim live. When an ecological disaster of biblical proportions threatens to destroy the Earth, the trio join forces in an attempt to save the planet, endangered not only by global warming but also by scientists and world politicians who think they are fighting the threat with cold bombs.

References

External links
  
 ดูไปบ่นไป เอคโค่ จิ๋วก้องโลก 3D/ณ๊อบ ศฐาณพงศ์ 
 เอคโค่ จิ๋วก้องโลก 3D – แอนิเมชั่น 3 มิติของไทยที่มีดีกว่าที่คิด 
 วิจารณ์หนัง เอคโค่ จิ๋วก้องโลก 

2012 animated films
2012 films
Thai animated films
Thai children's films
Thai 3D films
2012 3D films
2010s children's animated films
3D animated films